The 2021 Ligai Olii Tojikiston (Tajik: 2021 Лигаи Олии Тоҷикистон),, or 2021 Tajikistan Higher League was the 30th season of Tajikistan Higher League, Tajikistan's top division of association football. The season began on 4 April 2021, and consist of twenty-seven rounds of matches.

Season events
On 5 March, the Tajikistan Football Federation announced that the calendar of matches for the 2021 season will be drawn on 12 March.

Teams
On 5 March 2021, the Tajikistan Football Federation announced that the season would involve ten teams, with there being 27 matches in three rounds. The teams consist of CSKA Pamir, Dushanbe-83, Fayzkand, Istiklol, Istaravshan, Khatlon, Khujand, Kuktosh and newly promoted Eskhata Khujand, and Ravshan Kulob.

Personnel and sponsoring

Foreign players
Each Tajikistan Higher League club is permitted to register a maximum of six foreign players, with four allowed on the pitch at the same time.

In bold: Players that have been capped for their national team.

Managerial changes

League table

Fixtures and results

Rounds 1–18

Rounds 19–27

By match played

Season statistics

Scoring
 First goal of the season: Makhmadali Sadykov for Fayzkand against CSKA Pamir.

Top scorers

Hat-tricks

 4 Player scored 4 goals

Clean sheets

Awards

Monthly awards

References

External links
Football federation of Tajikistan

Tajikistan Higher League seasons
1
Tajik